Faridur Reza Sagar (born 22 February 1955) is a Bangladeshi writer and film producer. He is also the managing director of Impress Telefilm Ltd and Channel i. He was awarded the Bangla Academy Literary Award in 2005 and Ekushey Padak in 2015 by the Government of Bangladesh.

Early life 
Sagar was born in Dhaka, Bangladesh, to writer Rabeya Khatun and director Fazlul Haque.
Sagar played the leading role in East Pakistan's first children's cinema made by his father. Since his childhood he has been involved with many children-friendly TV shows on Bangladesh Television. He earned fame as a young presenter, program conductor and involving with television program since the inception of Bangladesh Television. His sister Keka Ferdousi is a Bangladeshi television chef and writer.

Career 

Sagar entered the film industry in 1966 as an actor, portraying lead role in first children's cinema in East Pakistan President. He also started writing literature, some mentionable publications are: A Story Bokk, Meghna-O-Galpa Buro, Meghna and Aladin's lamp, Meghna-O-Eti, Cox's Bazar Kakatua or Television, Jibober Shangee. He has written over fifty books for children. Adventure, mystery, travel, reminiscence, horror, Liberation War, science fiction - these are varieties of genres that he has in his bag of creativity, for children. He has written many scripts and dramas for children as well. He is the man who changed the image of the film industry who has solely produced at least 42 feature films.

While Bangladesh continues to face all sorts of complexities with party politics and rivalry, Sagar is found to be a neutralist. By his initiatives, he has made a neutral ground for open dialogues on Channel-i named Tritiyo Matra which is successfully going on air for the last six years. Through this program, he has made a common ground for opinion sharing among the political, economic, social leaders and the mass people. Through such he has made it easier for Bangladeshis around the world to watch their countries affairs on TV as well as express their views.

Awards 

In 2005, for his contribution for children's literature he was awarded the Bangla Academy Literary Award. Apart from this, he has received the Agrani Bank Children's Literature Award, Chander Haat Children's Literature Award, and Euro Children's Literature Award. Among film awards, he was awarded the Bangladesh Film Journalists Association (BACHSAS) Award, Cultural Reporters Award, National Film Award, and many national level awards.

Selected filmography

Producer 

 Punishment (2004)
 The Alienation (2006)
 Forever Flows (2006)
 Daruchini Dip (2007)
 On the Wings of Dreams (2007)
 Beyond the Circle (2009) 
 My Friend Rashed (2009)
 Third Person Singular Number (2009)
 Pleasure Boy Komola (2012)
 The Red Point (2012)
 Uttarer Sur (2012)
 Jalal's Story (2014)
 Krishnopaksho ( কৃষ্ণপক্ষ) (2016)

Writer 
 ''Damal (2022)

References

External links 
 

1955 births
Living people
People from Dhaka
Notre Dame College, Dhaka alumni
Bangladeshi film producers
Bangladeshi film directors
Best Film National Film Award (Bangladesh) winners
Recipients of the Ekushey Padak
Recipients of Bangla Academy Award
Channel i